Roundthorn is a tram stop on the Manchester Metrolink network. It opened on 3 November 2014 on the Airport Line, between Southmoor Road and Roundthorn Road. The stop is next to the Roundthorn Industrial Estate and is the closest Metrolink stop to Wythenshawe Hospital.

Services
Trams run every 12 minutes north to Victoria and south to Manchester Airport. Between 03:00 and 06:00, a service operates Deansgate-Castlefield and Manchester Airport every 20 minutes.

Ticket zones 
Roundthorn stop is located in ticket zones 3 and 4.

References

External links

 Metrolink stop information
 Roundthorn area map
 Light Rail Transit Association
 Airport route map

Tram stops in Manchester
Railway stations in Great Britain opened in 2014
2014 establishments in England